is the debut major label single by Japanese heavy metal band Babymetal. It was released in Japan on January 9, 2013, as the fourth overall single from the album Babymetal.

Background and release
The single was first announced after the concert Legend "I" at Shibuya O-East on October 6, 2012. An early version of the song can be heard in a video uploaded to the band's official YouTube channel entitled "Babymetal - My First Heavy Metal in Tokyo 2012", which also features part of a live performance of "Iine!". On November 8, 2012, an official trailer for the single and accompanying music was uploaded to the band's official YouTube channel. The trailers, along with a live performance at Sonisphere Festival, subtitled the song as "No More Bullying" and "No More, Bullying, Forever", respectively. An interview with the producers of the band was published in the December issue of Marquee to promote the single's release in January.

The single was released in four versions: a standard edition and three physical limited editions, "I", "D", and "Z". The DVDs included in the limited editions contain either footage of the music video for "Ijime, Dame, Zettai", or of a live performance by Babymetal. The single also had a promotional release to customers who purchased tickets to live performances of Legend "I", "D", or "Z".

Unlike previous singles released under Juonbu Records, no songs from the single appeared on a Sakura Gakuin album, due to "Headbangeeeeerrrrr!!!!!" having been already released the same school year.

Composition

"Ijime, Dame, Zettai" 

"Ijime, Dame, Zettai" has a melodic speed metal sound, with lyrics pushing for the eradication of bullying; the song itself has been labeled as a "world reformation" metal song. The serious vocals of Suzuka Nakamoto, coupled with the more comical vocals of Yui Mizuno and Moa Kikuchi give the title track a more distinctive sound. The song is performed in the key of C♯ minor; the key shifts to F minor and G♯ minor in the bridge, finishing in E minor. According to Blabbermouth.net, the song "quickly created a buzz due to its mix of melodic speed metal, sensational lyrics around the theme of "Ijime" and the band's performance, which incorporates the "Wall of Death.""

According to the band's website, the "Nemesis" version of the song, which is found on limited editions of the single, features guitars recorded by former Arch Enemy guitarist Christopher Amott.

Other songs 
Written by the same contributors as the band's previous single "Headbangeeeeerrrrr!!!!!", "Catch Me If You Can" contains elements of "digi-rock" (digital rock) and industrial metal, as well as a namahage-themed "death growl interlude", while the lyrics consist of a more comical theme of playing hide and seek. The song begins with footsteps; Mizuno admittedly expressed her fear of the ominous sounds, preferring to skip them when recording. The verse includes the three members speaking, although Nakamoto's lines were ultimately scrapped from the final track.

With arrangement by Yuyoyuppe, "Babymetal Death" begins with a symphonic intro, building up to a death metal number as voices shout out the phrase, letter by letter "Babymetal Death!!". The pun found in the name derives from the Japanese devoicing of the "/u/" sound, which is exploited in the word "death" (desu). As a result, the phrase can be read as "We are Babymetal" (Babymetal desu), which the band members used in the early years. Originally, the song in its original form released as a special feature from the "Headbangeeeeerrrrr!!!!!" single, was originally one second long, as a homage to the Napalm Death song "You Suffer", and was used as a final song to close performances for a while.

Reception 

Kazumi Nanba of Rolling Stone Japan reviewed the title track, commenting that with accordance to the "eradication of bullying" in the title, the song is very straightforward and filled with a cute interjections, mentioning a balance between the seriousness and humor in the metal accompaniment, though it is excessively exquisite.

The single debuted at number six on the Oricon Weekly Singles Chart on the week of January 21, 2013, selling 19,000 copies in its first week of release. The song also managed to peak at number five on the Oricon Daily Singles Chart. The song also managed to top the Tower Records Singles Chart.

Music video 
The music video for "Ijime, Dame, Zettai" was teased on November 8, 2012; it was uploaded in its entirety to the official YouTube channel on November 27, 2012.

The concept of the video originated from the song title, depicting a world where metal music is persecuted, and followers of the genre are hunted down. To combat this, the three members are summoned to revitalize the spirit of metal, forming the concept known as the "Metal Resistance". The costumes worn in the video carry tones of red and black, as well as medieval armor styles in the image of Joan of Arc. During the bridge of the song, Mizuno and Kikuchi take the challenge of engaging in a "metal guitar battle" using guitars that were warped and damaged in earlier scenes.

A live performance of the song at the Sonisphere Festival in 2014 was uploaded to the channel on August 26, 2015.

Live performances 

The song was premiered at the Sakura Gakuin concert Sakura Gakuin 2011 Nendo: New Departure at the Shibuya Duo Music Exchange on July 24, 2011. A month later, the song was performed at the annual Tokyo Idol Festival.

On November 21, 2012, the band performed the song on the Nippon Broadcasting System program MC Plus. In addition to collaborating with Tower Records for the 26th rendition of the event No Music, No Idol?, the band performed at several events, including the new year concert "One Song! Explosive Live!" at HMV Club Quattro in Shibuya on January 7, 2013, the Anime Festival Asia 2012 Show Screening at Tower Records in Shibuya on January 12, 2013, and the "Ijime, Dame, Zettai" in Osaka event on January 14, 2013.

On stage, the song begins with Mizuno and Kikuchi running across the stage from opposite ends, cueing the audience to mosh via the Wall of Death, which is different from the traditional manner. During the chorus, the three members jump and cross their arms into an "X", while shouting "Dame!" (No!) with their hands as kitsune signs. During the bridge of "Ijime, Dame, Zettai", Mizuno and Kikuchi choreograph a fight while Nakamoto and the crowd cheer on them with the sense of unity. Overall, the live performances has inspiration from those of the band X Japan.

"Babymetal Death" is often used as an opening track, mainly to excite the audience. The choreography consists of a conglomerate of dance moves from other songs in the band's repertoire. During the concert Legend "Z", the three members wore white robes for the encore, performing the song as well as and "Ijime, Dame, Zettai". A curtain was raised to obscure the stage beforehand, with lights from backstage projecting shadows of the members onto the sheet until the band resumed performance.

Track listings and formats 
Standard edition

"I", "D", and "Z" limited edition

World Reformation promotional edition

Credits and personnel 
Credits adapted from "Ijime, Dame, Zettai" standard and limited "I" single liner notes.

Recording and management
 Recorded at MukuStudio, Sound Arts Studio, S.O.L.I.D. Sound Lab, and Wacken Open Studio
 Mixed at Art Pop Entertainment, Hama Shobo Studio, S.O.L.I.D. Sound Lab, and Heartbeat Recording Studio
 Mastered at Parasight Mastering

Personnel

 Suzuka Nakamoto (SU-METAL) – vocals (lead and background)
 Yui Mizuno (YUIMETAL) – vocals (lead and background)
 Moa Kikuchi (MOAMETAL) – vocals (lead and background)
 Key Kobayashi (KOBAMETAL / KxBxMETAL / KITSUNE of METAL GOD) – executive producer, lyrics, music
 Millennium Japan (millennium JAPAN) – executive producer
 Tucky – mastering
 Christopher Amott – guitar
 Norikazu Nakayama (NAKAMETAL) – lyrics
 Tatsuya Tsubono (TSUBOMETAL) – lyrics, music
 Shion Hirota (EDOMETAL) – lyrics

 Takeru Youda (TAKEMETAL) – music
 Nobuki Narasaki (NARASAKI) – music
 Kyoto – arrangement
 Narametal (NARAMETAL) – arrangement
 Takehiro Mamiya (Yuyoyuppe / DJ'TEKINA//SOMETHING) – arrangement, audio mixing
 Naoki Ibaraki – recording, audio mixing
 Taro Isomura – audio mixing
 Seiji Toda – recording, audio mixing
 Masahiro Tamoto – assistant
 Shinya Yamazaki – assistant

Charts

Weekly charts

Daily charts

Release history

References

External links 
 Review by Rolling Stone Japan Edition
 Discography - Babymetal official website

2011 songs
2013 singles
Babymetal songs
Japanese-language songs
Songs about bullying
Speed metal songs
Toy's Factory singles